This page comprises the notable alumni of Xavier University – Ateneo de Cagayan. It comprises notable figures who were conferred and graduated from the institution. Among these distinguished figures are archbishops, engineers, a journalist, environmentalist, businesspeople, economist, author, basketball players, senators, politicians, priests, lawyers, public servants, legislators, secretary of presidential communication, chief justice, presidential candidate, vice president, presidential spokesperson, and presidents.

Alumni
 Rufus B. Rodriguez – lawyer; politician
 Teofisto T. Guingona Jr. – lawyer; Vice-President of the Philippines (2001–2004)
 Oscar S. Moreno – lawyer; politician
 Nereus O. Acosta – political scientist; politician
 Isabelo Lastimosa, Jr. – basketball player
 Nelbert Omolon – basketball player
 Aquilino Q. Pimentel, Jr.– lawyer; politician
 Tomas R. Osmeña – agriculturist; politician
 Jesus Nicanor P. Perlas III – environmentalist; 2010 elections presidential candidate
 Jose Ruperto Martin M. Andanar – journalist; radio and television host, secretary of Presidential Communications Office and acting presidential spokesperson
 Ronnie Vicente C. Lagnada – civil engineer; 14th Mayor of Butuan (2016–present)
 Jose C. Alvarez - entrepreneur; representative of Palawan's 2nd legislative district (2022-present); Governor of Palawan (2013-2022)
 Jonahmae P. Pacala – author

Honoris causa
 Carlos P. Garcia – lawyer; President of the Philippines (1957–1961)
 Justiniano R. Borja – politician
 Rev. Fr. Eduardo P. Hontiveros, S.J. – priest; composer
 Miriam P. Defensor-Santiago – lawyer; politician
 Corazon C. Aquino – President of the Philippines (1986–1992)
 Reynato S. Puno – lawyer; Chief Justice of the Supreme Court of the Philippines (2006–2010)
 Most. Rev. Orlando B. Quevedo, O.M.I., D.D. – Cardinal Archbishop Emeritus of Cotabato (1998–2018)
 Most. Rev. Luis Antonio G. Tagle, D.D., S.Th.D. – Prefect of the Congregation for the Evangelization of Peoples; Cardinal Archbishop Emeritus of Manila (2011–2019)
 Corazon J. Soliman – social worker; Secretary of Social Welfare and Development (2001–2005; 2010–2016)
 Teresita Quintos-Deles – academic; Presidential Advisor on the Peace Process (2003–2005; 2010–2016)
 Fr. Edwin A. Gariguez –  priest; environmentalist
 Diosdado P. Banatao – engineer

Faculty
 Fr. Miguel Anselmo A. Bernad, S.J. – priest; professor of literature
 Most Rev. Antonio J. Ledesma, S.J., D.D. – Archbishop Emeritus of Cagayan de Oro (2006–2020); dean of Agriculture (1984–1994) and of Arts and Sciences (1994–1996)
 Fr. William F. Masterson, S.J. – priest; dean of Agriculture (1953–1984)
 Jose Manuel C. Montalván – war hero; ROTC instructor (1933–1937)

 
Xavier